is a Welsh-medium all age school located in Trevethin, Pontypool in Torfaen, Wales and named for Saint Gwynllyw. The school had 926 pupils on roll in 2017. The school changed its name from ‘Ysgol Gyfun Gwynllyw’ to ‘Ysgol Gymraeg Gwynllyw’ [] in 2022 to incorporate going from a High School to an all age school, the first in South East Wales.

History 
The school was founded in 1988 as the first Welsh-medium school in the former Gwent LEA area and is housed in accommodation previously used for Trevethin Comprehensive School.

For its first three years Ysgol Gyfun Gwynllyw was housed in the old Abercarn Infant School house but soon outgrew the building.  As one of the fastest growing schools in Wales, bigger premises were needed and the old Trevethin upper school was suggested by the education authority. The school is in Trevethin, Pontypool, Torfaen. 

Pupils at the school are taught completely in Welsh and come from a range of Welsh-language feeder schools from 4 different counties; Torfaen, Blaenau Gwent, Monmouthshire and Newport. The aim is to immerse pupils in Welsh and to enable them to be educated entirely in it as their native language. As of 2016, the number of new pupils each year has been falling due to the opening of a new Welsh comprehensive school in Newport.

An inspection report by Estyn in 2008 stated 94.5% of the pupils came from homes where English is the main language; 5.3% came from Welsh-speaking homes. The same report also says that all pupils speak Welsh as a first language or to an equivalent standard.

In 2009 the school was given a grant to make improvements and replace the old static cabins with a new and improved complex building. Construction was completed in 2012. In 2018 the school was given £3 million to develop a primary school, and in 2020 the work began on construction, beginning with the demolition of the three remaining static cabins on the site of the future primary school.

Notable former pupils

 Aimee-Ffion Edwards - TV actress
 Steffan Lewis - politician
 Cerys Hale - rugby player
Aneurin Owen - rugby player 
 Lloyd Lewis - rugby player, TV presenter

References 

[] Torfaen Council article - new Welsh primary school Ysgol Gyfun Gwynllyw|ysgol Gymraeg Gwynllyw - 26/08/2022

[] - South Wales Article - School of the Week. 22-09-2021

External links 
 

Secondary schools in Torfaen
Educational institutions established in 1988
1988 establishments in Wales
Welsh-language schools
Pontypool